Aignan may refer to:

 Aignan, Gers, a commune of France
 Aignan of Orleans (358–453), Bishop of Orleans, canonized
 Nicolas Dupont-Aignan (born 1961), French politician